Robson Blake (born 15 May 1995) is a former Welsh rugby union player who plays as a flanker.

Blake made his debut for the Dragons regional team in 2016 having previously played for the Dragons academy and Bedwas RFC. 
He was released by the Dragons at the end of the 2017-18 season. In August 2018 Blake retired from rugby due to a concussion injury.

References

External links 
Dragons profile

1995 births
Living people
Bedwas RFC players
Dragons RFC players
Rugby union players from Newport, Wales
Welsh rugby union players
Rugby union flankers